"Temptation Eyes" is a 1970 hit song by The Grass Roots. It was released on their second compilation album, More Golden Grass.

Background
The song reached number 15 on the U.S. Billboard Hot 100 in 1971. It spent 18 weeks on the charts, making it the band's single of greatest longevity, sustaining itself three weeks longer than their greatest hit, "Midnight Confessions".

Two versions exist.  The original mono mix had its vocal chorus section double-tracked, while the chorus in the stereo mix uses one voice (single-tracked).

Grass Roots' lead singer Rob Grill would in 1991 cite "Temptation Eyes" as his personal favorite Grass Roots song.

Chart performance

Weekly charts

Year-end charts

Cover versions
Erica Smith covered "Temptation Eyes" on her 1989 Columbia Release Holiday LP, Produced by: Gary Spaniola. 
Blake Babies covered "Temptation Eyes" on their 1991 Innocence and Experience LP. 
The Replacements also performed the song for the Let It Be sessions in 1984. The song has shown up in bootleg form, and was later included on the deluxe edition of Let it Be.

References

External links
  

1970 singles
The Grass Roots songs
ABC Records singles
Dunhill Records singles
1970 songs